The 1908 Democratic National Convention took place from July 7 to July 10, 1908, at Denver Auditorium Arena in Denver, Colorado.

The event is widely considered a significant part of Denver's political and social history.

The Convention 
The 1908 convention was the first convention of a major political party in a Western state. The city did not host another nominating convention until a century later, at the 2008 Democratic National Convention.

The convention was the second Democratic National Convention to include female delegates. They were Mary C.C. Bradford (Colorado) and Elizabeth Pugsley Hayward (Mrs. Henry J. Hayward) (Utah). Alternate delegates were Mrs. Charles Cook (Colorado), Harriet G. Hood (Wyoming), and Sara L. Ventress (Utah).

Presidential nomination

Presidential candidates 

Three names were placed in nomination: William Jennings Bryan, John A. Johnson, and George Gray. Bryan was unanimously declared the candidate for president after handily winning the first ballot's roll call.

Vice Presidential nomination

Candidates

Speculated Candidates 

John W. Kern of Indiana was unanimously declared the candidate for vice-president without a formal ballot after the names of Charles A. Towne, Archibald McNeil, and Clark Howell were withdrawn from consideration.

See also 
 History of the United States Democratic Party
 1908 Republican National Convention
 1908 United States presidential election

References

External links 
 Official report of the proceedings of the Democratic national convention, held in Denver, Colorado, July 7, 8, 9 and 10, 1908
 Democratic Party Platform of 1908 at The American Presidency Project

1908 United States presidential election
1908 in Colorado
20th century in Denver
Conventions in Denver
Political conventions in Colorado
Colorado Democratic Party
Democratic National Conventions
1908 conferences
July 1908 events